General elections were held in Northern Rhodesia on 16 July 1932. Of the seven elected seats in the Legislative Council, four had only one candidate, who was elected unopposed; Herbert Goodhart in the Eastern constituency, John Brown in Midlands, Chad Norris in Northern and Thomas Henderson Murray in Southern. The only contested seats were the two in Livingstone and the one in Ndola.

Electoral system
The seven elected members of the Legislative Council were elected from six constituencies; five constituencies returned a single member, whilst Livingstone and Western returned two. There were a total of 2,565 registered voters.

Campaign
In Ndola incumbent member Kennedy Harris, a businessman, was challenged by Herbert Walsh, a trade unionist. In the two-member Livingstone and Western constituency, incumbents Leopold Moore (owner of Northern Rhodesia's only newspaper, The Livingstone Mail) and Frank Lowe (an accountant and mayor of Livingstone) were challenged by former Livingstone mayor Charles Knight and Deputy mayor F.D. Law.

Results

References

1932 in Northern Rhodesia
1932 elections in Africa
1932
1932